In coordination chemistry, a bridging ligand is a ligand that connects two or more atoms, usually metal ions. The ligand may be atomic or polyatomic.  Virtually all complex organic compounds can serve as bridging ligands, so the term is usually restricted to small ligands such as pseudohalides or to ligands that are specifically designed to link two metals.

In naming a complex wherein a single atom bridges two metals, the bridging ligand is preceded by the Greek letter mu, μ, with a subscript number denoting the number of metals bound to the bridging ligand. μ2 is often denoted simply as μ. When describing coordination complexes care should be taken not to confuse μ with η ('eta'), which relates to hapticity. Ligands that are not bridging are called terminal ligands.

List of bridging ligands
Virtually all ligands are known to bridge, with the exception of amines and ammonia.  Common bridging ligands include most of the common anions.

Many simple organic ligands form strong bridges between metal centers.

Examples

Bonding
For doubly bridging (μ2-) ligands, two limiting representation are 4-electron and 2-electron bonding interactions. Complicating this analysis is the possibility of metal–metal bonding. Computational studies suggest that metal-metal bonding is absent in many compounds where the metals are separated by bridging ligands. For example, calculations suggest that  lacks an iron–iron bond by virtue of a 3-center 2-electron bond involving one of three bridging CO ligands.

Bridge-terminal exchange
The interchange of bridging and terminal ligands is called bridge-terminal exchange.  The process is invoked to explain the fluxional properties of metal carbonyl and metal isocyanide complexes.   Some complexes that exhibit this process are cobalt carbonyl and cyclopentadienyliron dicarbonyl dimer:
Co2(μ-CO)2(CO)6    Co2(μ-CO)2(CO)4(CO)2
(C5H5)2Fe2(μ-CO)2(CO)2   (C5H5)2Fe2(μ-CO)2(CO)2

These dynamic processes, which are degenerate, proceed via an intermediate where the CO ligands are all terminal, i.e. .

Polyfunctional ligands
Polyfunctional ligands can attach to metals in many ways and thus can bridge metals in diverse ways, including sharing of one atom or using several atoms. Examples of such polyatomic ligands are the oxoanions  and the related carboxylates, and the polyoxometalates. Several organophosphorus ligands have been developed that bridge pairs of metals, a well-known example being .

See also 
Bridging carbonyl

References 

Coordination chemistry